The 1966 LPGA Tour was the 17th season since the LPGA Tour officially began in 1950. The season ran from March 17 to December 4. The season consisted of 32 official money events. Kathy Whitworth won the most tournaments, nine. She also led the money list with earnings of $33,517.

The season saw the first tournament in Canada, the Supertest Ladies Open. An unofficial event, The Lagunita Invitational, was played in Venezuela. This was the last year that the Titleholders Championship, an LPGA major, would be played in Georgia. It would return for one final year in 1972. The LPGA introduced the Player of the Year in 1966, won by Kathy Whitworth. There were two first-time winners in 1966: Gloria Ehret and Sandra Spuzich.

The tournament results and award winners are listed below.

Tournament results
The following table shows all the official money events for the 1966 season. "Date" is the ending date of the tournament. The numbers in parentheses after the winners' names are the number of wins they had on the tour up to and including that event. Majors are shown in bold.

Awards

References

External links
LPGA Tour official site
1966 season coverage at golfobserver.com

LPGA Tour seasons
LPGA Tour